21 (twenty-one) is the natural number following 20 and preceding 22.

The current century is the 21st century AD, under the Gregorian calendar.

In mathematics
21 is:

 a composite number, its proper divisors being 1, 3 and 7, and a deficient number as the sum of these divisors is less than the number itself.
 a Fibonacci number as it is the sum of the preceding terms in the sequence, 8 and 13.
 the fifth Motzkin number.
 a triangular number, because it is the sum of the first six natural numbers (1 + 2 + 3 + 4 + 5 + 6 = 21).
 an octagonal number.
 a Padovan number, preceded by the terms 9, 12, 16 (it is the sum of the first two of these) in the padovan sequence.
 a Blum integer, since it is a semiprime with both its prime factors being Gaussian primes.
 the sum of the divisors of the first 5 positive integers (i.e., 1 + (1 + 2) + (1 + 3) + (1 + 2 + 4) + (1 + 5))
 the smallest non-trivial example of a Fibonacci number whose digits are Fibonacci numbers and whose digit sum is also a Fibonacci number.
 a Harshad number.
 a repdigit in quarternary (1114).
 the smallest natural number that is not close to a power of 2, 2n, where the range of closeness is ±n.
 the smallest number of differently sized squares needed to square the square.
See a brief proof below.

Note that a necessary condition for n is that for any a coprime to n, a and n - a must satisfy the condition above, therefore at least one of a and n - a must only have factor 2 and 5.

Let  denote the quantity of the numbers smaller than n that only have factor 2 and 5 and that are coprime to n, we instantly have .

We can easily see that for sufficiently large n, but ,  as n goes to infinity, thus  fails to hold for sufficiently large n.

In fact, For every n > 2, we have

and

so  fails to hold when n > 273 (actually, when n > 33).

Just check a few numbers to see that '= 2, 3, 4, 5, 6, 7, 8, 9, 11, 12, 15, 21.

In science
The atomic number of scandium.
It is very often the day of the solstices in both June and December, though the precise date varies by year.

Age 21
In thirteen countries, 21 is the age of majority. See also: Coming of age. 
In eight countries, 21 is the minimum age to purchase tobacco products.
In seventeen countries, 21 is the drinking age. 
In nine countries, it is the voting age.
In the United States:
21 is the minimum age at which a person may gamble or enter casinos in most states (since alcohol is usually provided).
21 is the minimum age to purchase a handgun or handgun ammunition under federal law.
21 is the age at which one can purchase multiple tickets to an R-rated film.
In some states, 21 is the minimum age to accompany a learner driver, provided that the person supervising the learner has held a full driver license for a specified amount of time. See also: List of minimum driving ages.

In sports 

 Twenty-one is a variation of street basketball, in which each player, of which there can be any number, plays for himself only (i.e. not part of a team); the name comes from the requisite number of baskets.
 In three-on-three basketball games held under FIBA rules, branded as 3x3, the game ends by rule once either team has reached 21 points.
 In badminton, and table tennis (before 2001), 21 points are required to win a game.
 In AFL Women's, the top-level league of women's Australian rules football, each team is allowed a squad of 21 players (16 on the field and five interchanges).
 In NASCAR, 21 has been used by Wood Brothers Racing and Ford for decades. The team has won 99 NASCAR Cup Series races, a majority with 21, and 5 Daytona 500’s. Their current driver is Harrison Burton.

In other fields

21 is:
The Twenty-first Amendment repealed the Eighteenth Amendment, thereby ending Prohibition.
The number of spots on a standard cubical (six-sided) die (1+2+3+4+5+6)
The number of firings in a 21-gun salute honoring royalty or leaders of countries
"Twenty One", a 1994 song by an Irish rock band The Cranberries
"21 Guns", a 2009 song by the punk-rock band Green Day
Twenty One Pilots, an American musical duo
 There are 21 trump cards of the tarot deck if one does not consider The Fool to be a proper trump card.
The standard TCP/IP port number for FTP connection
The Twenty-One Demands were a set of demands which were sent to the Chinese government by the Japanese government of Okuma Shigenobu in 1915
21 Demands of MKS led to the foundation of Solidarity in Poland.
 In Israel, the number is associated with the profile 21 (the military profile designation granting an exemption from the military service)
 Duncan MacDougall reported that 21 grams is the weight of the soul, according to an experiment.
 The number of the French department Côte-d'Or
 Twenty-One (card game), an ancient card game in which the key value and highest-winning point total is 21
 Blackjack, a modern version of Twenty-One played in casinos
 The number of shillings in a guinea.
 The number of solar rays in the flag of Kurdistan.
 Twenty-One, an American game show that became the center of the 1950s quiz show scandals when it was shown to be rigged.
 The number on the logo for the American game show Catch 21
 Twenty-One, a 1991 British-American drama film directed by Don Boyd and starring Patsy Kensit.

References

Integers